The men's 4 × 100 metre freestyle relay event at the 2010 Asian Games took place on 16 November 2010 at Guangzhou Aoti Aquatics Centre.

There were 15 teams who took part in this event. Two heats were held. The heat in which a team competed did not formally matter for advancement, as the teams with the top eight times from the both field qualified for the finals.

China won the gold medal.

Schedule
All times are China Standard Time (UTC+08:00)

Records

Results 
Legend
DNS — Did not start

Heats

Final

References
 16th Asian Games Results

External links 
 Men's 4 × 100m Freestyle Relay Heats Official Website
 Men's 4 × 100m Freestyle Relay Ev.No.26 Final Official Website

Swimming at the 2010 Asian Games